Luis Guilherme Lira dos Santos (born 9 February 2006) is a Brazilian footballer who plays as a midfielder for Palmeiras.

Club career
Born in Aracaju, Luis Guilherme played in numerous soccer schools in his hometown before joining Palmeiras in 2017. He signed his first professional contract with the club in June 2022.

International career
Luis Guilherme was called up to the Brazil under-16 squad for the 2022 Montaigu Tournament, where he scored three goals in four games.

Style of play
A technical midfielder with good on-field decision making, Luis Guilherme is renowned for his pace, clocking a top speed of 36.4km/h in the 2022 Copa do Brasil Sub-17 final against Vasco da Gama. He lists Argentine legend Lionel Messi as an inspiration to him.

References

2006 births
Living people
People from Aracaju
Sportspeople from Sergipe
Brazilian footballers
Brazil youth international footballers
Association football midfielders
Sociedade Esportiva Palmeiras players